Gerard Granollers and Adrián Menéndez-Maceiras were the defending champions but only Menéndez-Maceiras defended his title, partnering John Paul Fruttero. Ménendez-Maceiras lost in the first round to Luca Margaroli and Hugo Nys.

Purav Raja and Divij Sharan won the title after defeating Margaroli and Nys 3–6, 6–3, [11–9] in the final.

Seeds

Draw

References
 Main Draw

KPIT MSLTA Challenger - Doubles